Saint Fredigand of Deurne (or Frégaud, Frego, Fredegad, Fredegandus, Fridegandus of Turninum, Turne etc.; died ) was an 8th-century Irish missionary in the territory around Antwerp in what is now Belgium.
His feast day is 17 July.

Life

Saint Frédégand was an Irish disciple of Saint Foillan.
He became a missionary monk in the area near Antwerp today in Belgium, and was made abbot of Kerkelodor Abbey.
He died around 740 in Deurne, Belgium.
His feast day is 17 July.

"Saint Turninus"

The hagiographer Alban Butler (1710–1773) wrote in his Lives of the Fathers, Martyrs, and Other Principal Saints, under July 17,

The monks of St Augustine's Abbey, Ramsgate, wrote in their Book of Saints (1921),

John O'Hanlon notes that "In Butler's Lives of the Saints, and in the Circle of the Seasons, at the 17th of July, we find recorded St. Turninus, but this is evidently a mistake for St. Fredigandus."

De Ram's account

Pierre François Xavier de Ram (1804–1865), in his translation and revision of  Butler's Lives of the Fathers, Martyrs, and Other Principal Saints, replaced Butler's life of St. Turninus with a life of Saint Frégaud.
He wrote,

O'Hanlon's account

John O'Hanlon notes that, "Like many accounts regarding the early saints, those relating to St. Fredegandus are unsatisfactory, for want of consistency and agreement on particulars related. He is said to have flourished in the eight century, although other inferences may be drawn from the Acts which remain."
O'Hanlon summarizes what is known,

Notes

Sources

 
 
 

 

Medieval Irish saints on the Continent
8th-century deaths